Opostomias micripnus, commonly known as the obese dragonfish, is a species of deep-sea ray-finned fish of the family Stomiidae found in the Atlantic, Indian and Pacific oceans. The species was described in 1878 by Albert Günther.

References

Taxa described in 1878
Stomiidae
Taxa named by Albert Günther